Yavuzeli District is a district of Gaziantep Province of Turkey. Its seat is the town Yavuzeli. It had a population of 22,762 in 2022.

Settlements

Center neighborhoods 

 Cingife
 Cumhuriyet
 Fevzi Çakmak
 Hürriyet
 Sultan Selim

Rural neighborhoods 

 Akbayır
 Aşağıhöçüklü
 Aşağıkayabaşı
 Aşağıkekliktepe
 Bağtepe
 Bakırca
 Ballık
 Beğendik
 Bülbül
 Büyükkarakuyu
 Çiltoprak
 Çimenli
 Değirmitaş
 Düzce
 Göçmez
 Gülpınar
 Hacımallı
 Havuz
 Ilıcak
 Karabey
 Karahan
 Karahüseyinli
 Kasaba
 Keşrobası
 Kuzuyatağı
 Küçükkarakuyu
 Örenli
 Saraymağara
 Sarıbuğday
 Sarılar
 Süleymanobası
 Şenlikçe
 Tokaçlı
 Üçgöl
 Yarımca
 Yeniyurt
 Yöreli
 Yukarıkekliktepe
 Yukarıyeniköy

References 

Districts of Gaziantep Province